{{Infobox person
| name               = Miodrag Majić
| alt                = 
| caption            = 
| native_name        = Миодраг Мајић
| birth_name         = 
| birth_date         = 
| birth_place        = Belgrade, Socialist Federal Republic of Yugoslavia
| death_date         = 
| death_place        = 
| nationality        = Serbian
| other_names        = Miša Majić
| alma_mater         = University of Belgrade
| occupation         = Legal scholar, judge, author
| years_active       = 
| known_for          = 
| notable_works      = Deca zla
| website            = https://misamajic.com/
}}
Miodrag Majić  is a Serbian legal scholar, judge and author. He is the judge of the Court of Appeals in Belgrade, Serbia, and the author of numerous books, legal commentaries and articles. Majić is known as a devoted opponent of penal populism in Serbia, which caused various Serbian politicians (most notably Maja Gojković) to lead smear campaigns against him in 2019. In 2019, Majic authored a bestselling crime novel titled Deca zla (еng. Children of evil) which combines realistic depictions of criminal procedure in Serbia with themes of occultism and conspiracy theories.

 Biography 
Miodrag Majić was born on 17 November 1969 in Belgrade, then the capital of Socialist Federal Republic of Yugoslavia. He graduated from University of Belgrade Faculty of Law in 1995 and defended his doctorate in 2008. He speaks Serbian, English and Russian languages. Majić is the father of two sons.

 Notable works 
 Primena međunarodnog krivičnog prava u nacionalnim pravnim sistemima, Službeni glasnik Srbije, 2009
 Nature, Importance and limits of finding the Truth in criminal proceedings, Majić, Ilić, Pravni fakultet Univerziteta u Beogradu, 2013
 Вештина писања првостепене кривичне пресуде, Službeni glasnik Srbije, 2015
 Deca zla'', Vulkan, 2019

References 

1969 births
Living people
Serbian male writers
21st-century Serbian judges
Serbian legal scholars
University of Belgrade Faculty of Law alumni